25th Army may refer to:

25th Army (Soviet Union)
25th Army (Wehrmacht)
Twenty-Fifth Army (Japan)

See also
 Twenty-Fifth Air Force
 25th Brigade (disambiguation)
 XXV Corps (disambiguation)
 25th Regiment (disambiguation)
 25 Squadron (disambiguation)